The 2019–20 NBL Canada season was the ninth season of the National Basketball League of Canada. The regular season was supposed to run from December 26, 2019, to April 23, 2020. However, on March 12, the season was suspended due to the COVID-19 pandemic in Canada.

On April 1, the season was officially cancelled with the league saying they will "begin preparations for its tenth season in 2020–21". The 2020–21 season was also cancelled.

League changes
Because of financial difficulties, two of the league's teams, Saint John Riptide and Cape Breton Highlanders, were granted a one-year sabbatical, with the goal of finding new sponsors in order to rejoin the league next season, reducing the league to eight teams. The decrease in the number of teams also caused a change in the playoff format with the top two teams in each division qualifying for the postseason.

Offseason coaching changes 
The Halifax Hurricanes hired Ryan Marchand as head coach after the Hurricanes' head coach for the previous three seasons, Mike Leslie, was named team president and general manager.
 The London Lightning hired Doug Plumb, who had most recently been the head coach of the St. John's Edge. Plumb replaced Elliott Etherington who had been promoted during the previous season after the Lightning had fired Keith Vassell.
The St. John's Edge removed the interim status of head coach Steven Marcus.

Regular season 
Standings as of March 11:

z – Clinched home court advantage for the entire playoffs
c – Clinched home court advantage for the division playoffs
x – Clinched playoff spot

Attendance
As of games played 11 March 2020

Awards

Player of the Week award

Coach of the Month award

References

External links
NBL Canada website

 
National Basketball League of Canada seasons
2019–20 in Canadian basketball
NBL Canada